Catherine Cox may refer to:

 Catherine Cox (actress)
 Catherine Cox (netball)

See also
 Catharine Cox Miles
 Cathy Cox (disambiguation)
 Catherine Coxe House
 Kathy Cox (disambiguation)
 Katherine Cox (disambiguation)